Smiljana Rendić (27 August 192626 May 1994) was a Croatian woman journalist, translator, vaticanist, judaist scholar, poet, notable for her reporting from Second Vatican Council and for her censorship by ruling Communist authorities of Yugoslavia due to her Catholicism and Croatian nationality.

Biography 
Rendić was born in Split, Croatia in 1926, in the family of Marko and Ivana (née Ruzinović) Rendić, where she attended the gymnasium. Her family's property was confiscated by the Communist authorities due to her father's activity in Croatian Peasants' Party. Hence she was unable to finish her higher education, she was firstly employed in Jugovinil factory. Later she moved to Rijeka, where thanks to her knowledge of Italian language Rendić started working in the editorial committee of La Voce del Popolo newspaper. She also wrote for Pomorstvo (Seamanship) magazine until 1972, as well as reported for Glas Koncila and other Catholic periodicals under the guise of her pseudonyms Vjera Marini and Madam Berith. Rendić also published her poems (mostly sonnets) in various periodicals.

Rendić was sued by the Communist authorities for her article The genitive exit or the Second Croatian revival in Kritika magazine (no. 18) in 1971, in which she criticized Yugoslav integralism and "linguistic colonisation" of Croatian language (as partially stated in Declaration on the Name and Status of the Croatian Literary Language) and endorsed intellectual and academical requests of Croatian Spring. Rendić's advocate was Milan Vuković, who will later become president of the Supreme Court of Croatia. As a result of the show trial at the Supreme Court of SFRY in November 1973, Rendić was forcibly retired and sentenced to one-year prison punishment, while Kritika magazine was censored.

She was a member of the editorial committee of the Glas Koncila 1963–1994. For hers biblistic, judaistic and journalist work, she was posthumously awarded by Croatian Bishops' Conference unique award Zlatno pero ("Golden feather").

Works 
 Crni šator (Black tent), Glas Koncila, 1967.
 Katolički identitet i hrvatski preporod (Catholic identity and Croatian revival), Glas Koncila, Zagreb, 2012, .

References 

1926 births
1994 deaths
Journalists from Split, Croatia
Croatian translators
Croatian poets
20th-century journalists
20th-century translators